Ingrid Yeung Ho Poi-yan is the current Secretary for the Civil Service in Hong Kong, appointed on 1 July 2022 as part of John Lee's administration.

Biography 
According to her official government profile, she started government work in 1998 as an executive officer. She was the Commissioner for Transport from 2012-2017, the Permanent Secretary for Education from 2017-2020, and the Permanent Secretary for the Civil Service from 2020-2022.

Secretary for the Civil Service 
In October 2022, Yeung announced that the Civil Service code of conduct would be updated to remove the "political neutrality" core value. In addition, Yeung also said "Events in recent years and the international situation today shows the importance of patriots administering Hong Kong."

References 

Living people
Government officials of Hong Kong
Year of birth missing (living people)